Kilij Arslan III (Qilij Arslān; Modern Turkish: Kılıç Arslan, meaning "Sword Lion") was the Seljuq Sultan of Rûm for a short period between 1204 and 1205 succeeding his father Suleiman II.  He was succeeded by his uncle Kaykhusraw I. Kilij Arslan had a daughter named Gawhar Khatun.

References 

1205 deaths
Sultans of Rum
Year of birth unknown
Seljuk dynasty
13th-century Turkic people